Arlan Hamilton is an investor and the founder and managing partner of Backstage Capital. In May 2020, Hamilton released her first book from Penguin Random House entitled It's About Damn Time: How to Turn Being Underestimated into Your Greatest Advantage, which is based on her personal journey into entrepreneurship and venture capital.

Career
In 2015, Hamilton founded Backstage Capital, a fund that invests in "underestimated founders". Underestimated founders for the fund are defined as women, people of color, and members of the LGBTQ community. To date, Backstage Capital has raised more than $15 million and has invested in more than 150 startups.

Prior to her venture capital role, Hamilton founded and published the indie magazine Interlude and prior to that, served as tour manager to Atlantic Records recording artist Janine.

In May 2018, Hamilton announced her firm would also attempt to raise a $36 million fund specifically for black female founders.

Hamilton was the subject of a six-episode series on the Gimlet Media podcast Startup. Hamilton is mostly complimentary about the podcast series, but did take issue with how she was portrayed, especially in sequences that cast her in an irresponsible light. Hamilton's Backstage Capital's podcast The Bootstrapped VC features episodes that are reactions to the Gimlet series.

In June 2019 Hamilton received recognition from Business Insider as one of the 23 most powerful LGBTQ+ people in tech.

Hamilton has funded a scholarship for black female pilots, and a scholarship for black students at the University of Oxford.

In June of 2022, TechCrunch reported that BackStage Capital had laid off most of its staff and was pausing net new investments.

Personal life
In 2019, Hamilton married German composer and actress, Anna Eichenauer.

In 2021, Hamilton paid $112,500 for a 1956 Chevy truck owned by her personal icon Janet Jackson.

Writing
Before becoming a venture capitalist, Hamilton gained notoriety as a blogger on "Your Daily Lesbian Moment," a blog site and point of connection for women seeking both platonic and romantic relationships with other women.

In May 2020, Hamilton published the book entitled, "It's About Damn Time," written with Rachel L. Nelson. The book is part memoir and part how-to for people who are generally underestimated in society. In the book, Hamilton details her early career as a music tour producer and, on pivoting to venture capital, the tactics she used to start the VC fund Backstage Capital.

Awards
 2018 – Fortune 40 Under 40 
2021 — Fast Company Queer 50
2022 — Fast Company Queer 50

References

1980 births
Living people
Women in finance
African-American business executives
21st-century American businesspeople
21st-century American businesswomen
American LGBT businesspeople
21st-century African-American women
21st-century African-American people
20th-century African-American people
21st-century LGBT people
20th-century African-American women